Edmund Leopold Friedrich, Prince of Schwarzenberg (18 November 1803, in Vienna – 17 November 1873, in Orlík Castle) was the last created Austrian field marshal of the 19th century.

Life 

He was the youngest son of famous field marshal Karl Philipp, Prince of Schwarzenberg, who won the Battle of Leipzig in 1813 against Napoleon Bonaparte, and his wife Countess Maria Anna von Hohenfeld (1768–1848), widowed Princess Esterhazy. Edmund entered the Austrian-Hungarian Army in 1821, was colonel in 1836 and major general in 1844. In 1848 he fought in Italy as commander of a brigade under Joseph Radetzky von Radetz. He distinguished himself in the battle for Milan and received, on 4 August 1848, the Knight's Cross of the Military Order of Maria Theresa.
Shortly after, he was sent to Hungary, where he took part in the Winter campaign of 1848/49.

At the outbreak of the Second Italian War of Independence in 1859, he commanded the 3rd Armeekorps at the Battle of Solferino. After this, he was commanding general in Austria, Salzburg and Steiermark, until he was relieved from command in 1860 for "reasons of health".

In 1862, he was named Knight in the Order of the Golden Fleece, and on 18 October 1867 field marshal, at the occasion of the inauguration of his father's statue on the Schwarzenbergplatz in Vienna.

1803 births
1873 deaths
Field marshals of Austria
Edmund
Nobility from Vienna
Princes of Schwarzenberg
Austrian generals
Austrian soldiers
Military personnel from Vienna
Knights of the Golden Fleece of Austria
Knights Cross of the Military Order of Maria Theresa